Rita Atik (born 22 October 1997 in Casablanca) is a Moroccan tennis player.

In 2013, she was the top Moroccan finisher (round of 16) for the girls at the Mediterranee Avenir.

She has competed multiple times in the main draw of the Grand Prix SAR La Princesse Lalla Meryem.

ITF Junior Finals

Singles Finals (5–1)

Doubles finals (3–4)

References

External links
 
 
 

1997 births
Living people
Moroccan female tennis players
Sportspeople from Rabat
Moroccan expatriates in the United States
African Games medalists in tennis
African Games silver medalists for Morocco
Competitors at the 2019 African Games
20th-century Moroccan women
21st-century Moroccan women